Zollernia is a genus of the family Fabaceae native to Central and South America. Zollernia are trees or shrubs that flower annually.

Leaves of Zollernia ilicifolia are used medicinally as an analgesic and antiulcerogenic by the peoples of the Brazilian Tropical Atlantic Rainforest.

References

Exostyleae
Fabaceae genera
Flora of Central America
Flora of South America
Flora of Brazil
Flora of the Atlantic Forest
Medicinal plants of South America
Taxa named by Prince Maximilian of Wied-Neuwied
Trees of Central America
Trees of South America